Roy C. Ketcham High School, more informally Ketcham High School or RCK, is a public secondary school under jurisdiction of the Wappingers Central School District. Located in Wappinger Falls, New York, United States, the school serves approximately 1,600 students in grades nine through twelve residing in the southwest of Dutchess County. Their mascot is the Ketcham Indian.

History 
As a result of considerable population growth in Dutchess County during the 1940's and 1950's, a new senior high school was built and opened to students in the fall of 1962.  It was named in honor of Roy C. Ketcham, who had been a prominent member of the town's board of education for a quarter of a century.

In 1987 the school became involved in a national controversy when 11th grade African-American student Tawana Brawley skipped class and faked her own abduction and rape, falsely accusing four white men of the crime which included writing racial slurs on her body and smearing her in faeces. A grand jury hearing later found all the allegations to have been fabricated and Brawley lost a defamation suit against one of her victims.

Athletics

Cheerleading 
Bowling
Basketball 
Football
Golf
Crew Club
Hockey Club 
Baseball 
Gymnastics 
Soccer
Track and Field
Cross Country
Tennis
Lacrosse Club 
Wrestling 
Volleyball 
Softball 
Swimming
Field Hockey Section 1 (NYSPHSAA)

Academics 
The music department occasionally hosts regional events at the school, such as NYSSMA competitions, Area All State Festivals, and All County Jazz Festivals. Roy C. Ketcham's current principal is David Seipp. The assistant principals for the 2020-2021 school year are Megan D'Alessandro, Kathleen Schneck, Michael Lopez, and Nicolle Strang.

Notable alumni

 Tyler Adams, athlete, soccer midfielder.
Brigetta Barrett, athlete, Olympic high jumper.
 Dario Brose, athlete, 
 Jeh Johnson (born 1957, class of 1975), lawyer who was United States Secretary of Homeland Security from 2013 to 2017.
 Ryan Kienle, musician, bassist.
 Keith Lockhart, music director of the Boston Pops Orchestra.
 Bo Oshoniyi, athlete, soccer goalkeeper.
 John Regan, musician, bassist.
 Mary Chris Wall, actress.
 D. B. Woodside, actor.
 Tim Wyskida, musician, drummer.

References

External links 
 School website

1952 establishments in New York (state)
Educational institutions established in 1952
Public high schools in Dutchess County, New York
School buildings completed in 1962